The 1798 Vermont gubernatorial election for Governor of Vermont took place throughout September, and resulted in the re-election of Isaac Tichenor to a one-year term.

The Vermont General Assembly met in Vergennes on October 11. The Vermont House of Representatives appointed a committee to examine the votes of the freemen of Vermont for governor, lieutenant governor, treasurer, and members of the governor's council.

In the popular election, Isaac Tichenor was chosen for a second one-year term. In the election for lieutenant governor, the voters selected Paul Brigham for a third one-year term. The freemen also re-elected Samuel Mattocks as treasurer, his twelfth one-year term. Vote totals were reported in local newspapers as follows.

Results

References

Vermont gubernatorial elections
gubernatorial
Vermont